Yves Delnord (born 30 September 1946) is a French sports shooter. He competed in the men's 50 metre rifle three positions event at the 1976 Summer Olympics.

References

1946 births
Living people
French male sport shooters
Olympic shooters of France
Shooters at the 1976 Summer Olympics
Place of birth missing (living people)